The District Heights–Seat Pleasant Line, designated Route V14, is a daily bus route operated by the Washington Metropolitan Area Transit Authority between the Deanwood station of the Orange Line of the Washington Metro and Penn Mar Shopping Center in District Heights. The line operates every 20–30 minutes during the rush hour, 60 minutes during weekday middays, and 60 minutes on the weekends. V14 trips are roughly 40–45 minutes long.

Background
Route V14 operates daily between Deanwood station and Penn Mar Shopping Center. Select trips are also operated between Penn Mar Shopping Center and Addison Road station only. The route provides service inside multiple neighborhoods to various Metrorail stations.

Route V14 currently operates out of Landover division.

History
Routes V14 and V15 were created as brand new Metrobus Routes to provide alternative Metrobus service between the newly opened Addison Road station & Penn Mar Shopping Center on January 4, 1981, when the V12 was shortened to operate between Addison Road and Potomac Avenue stations only. The main difference was that the V14 and V15 would mostly operate along Addison Road, Central Avenue, Suffolk Avenue, Walker Mill Road and other various streets instead of operating straight along Pennsylvania Avenue. While V14 would be the primary Metrobus Route on the line that operate throughout most of the day, route V15 would only operate during the weekday peak-hours only.

1993 Changes
On December 11, 1993, both the V14 and V15 were extended north from Addison Road station, to operate to Deanwood station in order to replace the R12 former routing between Deanwood and Addison Road stations, via Central Avenue, Hill Road, Seat Pleasant Drive, Addison Road, and Minnesota Avenue NE. Main differences were that the V14 would operate straight on Hill Road between the intersections of Seat Pleasant Drive and Central Avenue while the V15 would divert from the intersection of Hill Road onto the intersection of Hastings Drive, then make turn onto the intersection of Pepper Mill Drive, before returning onto Central Avenue. The routing between Addison Road and Penn Marr Shopping Center mostly remained the same other than for a small segment in the Pepper Mill Village neighborhood that was altered. As a result of these changes, the line was renamed from the District Heights Line to the District Heights–Seat Pleasant Line.

2015 Proposed Changes
In 2015, WMATA proposed to eliminate route V15 and the segment along Pepper Mill Drive and Hastings Drive. Route V14 would add weekend service and run its full route on Sundays instead of terminating at Addison Road station.

2016 Changes
On March 27, 2016, route V15 was discontinued and replaced by the V14 which added weekend service. Route V14 also would operate the full route on Sundays between Deanwood station and Penn Mar Shopping Center instead of Addison Road station.

References

V14